Goes Classic is the twenty-eighth album by Klaus Schulze. It was originally released in 1994. This is the sixth of seven early-1990s Klaus Schulze albums not to be reissued by Revisited Records. Goes Classic was released after Schulze's Silver Edition 10-disc CD box set, technically making this album his thirty-eighth. The album consists of electronic renditions of six well-known classical pieces, plus one original Schulze composition.

In 2012 the Russian label Mirumir released a double vinyl edition titled Midi Klassik.

Track listing

External links
 Goes Classic at the official site of Klaus Schulze
 

Klaus Schulze albums
1994 albums